Mamoru (まもる, マモル) is a masculine Japanese given name. Notable people with the name include:

 Marcus Mamoru Toji (born 1984), American actor
, Japanese composer
, Japanese composer best known for his work with animator Hayao Miyazaki
, anime director
, Japanese shogi player
, Japanese film director
, Japanese inventor, music composer, and Chief Executive Officer of VitaCraft and VitaCraft Japan
, Olympics marksmen
, Japanese anime director
, Japanese boxer
, Japanese middle-distance runner
, Japanese actor and voice actor
, Japanese astronaut
, Japanese animator and character designer
, Japanese film director
, Japanese impostor
 Mamoru Sato (born 1937), American modernist sculptor
, Imperial Japanese Navy officer
, Japanese Minister of Foreign affairs at the end of World War II
, Japanese illustrator/manga artist
, Japanese ice hockey player
, Japanese criminal/murderer
, Japanese film director, screenwriter and actor
, Japanese architect
, Japanese mixed martial artist

Fictional characters
, a character in Higurashi no Naku Koro ni visual novel and anime series
, a character in the Sailor Moon series
, a character in the Inazuma Eleven
, a character in From the New World
, a character in Forbidden Siren
, a character in the Captain Tsubasa series
, a character in Kage Kara Mamoru!
Mamoru Kodai in Space Battleship Yamato 
, a character in the Fighting Spirit (はじめの一歩, Hajime no Ippo) series
, a character in Mamoru-kun ni Megami no Shukufuku wo!
 Mamoru-kun, the anthropomorphic canine mascot for Fukuoka Prefecture's disaster prevention, created by CyberConnect2. Mamoru-kun was originally planned to be the main character of Tail Concerto II, but due to the poor sales of the last game, it never came to fruition.

See also
Kage Kara Mamoru!, series of light novels written by Achi Taro
Mamoru-kun ni Megami no Shukufuku o!, a light novel series by Hiroki Iwata
4613 Mamoru, a main-belt asteroid

Japanese masculine given names